Andros Darryl Townsend (born 16 July 1991) is an English professional footballer who plays as a winger for  club Everton.

A graduate of the Tottenham Hotspur academy, Townsend was initially loaned out to several League One and then Championship clubs alongside limited Tottenham appearances, before making his Premier League debut in September 2012. After further limited appearances and then a half-season loan to Premier League club Queens Park Rangers, Townsend established himself as a Tottenham player between 2013 and 2015. He subsequently fell out of favour at Tottenham, and following a short spell at Newcastle United in the 2015–16 season, he transferred to Crystal Palace in the summer of 2016. He spent five years at Palace before departing for Everton.

In his senior international career, Townsend earned his first England cap on 11 October 2013, and made 13 appearances, scoring three goals.

Club career

Tottenham Hotspur

Early career
Townsend joined the Tottenham Hotspur academy at the age of eight. In March 2009, he went on loan to Yeovil Town, making his football league debut against Milton Keynes Dons alongside fellow Spurs academy player Jonathan Obika. He made ten appearances and scored one goal for Yeovil as they avoided relegation.

Initial loans
Townsend entered the senior Tottenham team under manager Harry Redknapp. In August 2009, he went on a month's loan to League One club Leyton Orient, extended at the end of the month to the end of December, after which he returned to Tottenham. In 26 appearances for Orient, Townsend scored twice, including a "great goal" in a 3–3 draw against Yeovil, passing three opposing players with a run that began in his own half, leading the opposition manager to lament that his players had not been more ruthless and taken him down with a professional foul.

Having not yet made his Tottenham debut, on 14 January 2010, Townsend was again taken on loan by a League One club, Milton Keynes Dons, until the end of the season, although he was recalled after just two months due to injuries. In nine matches for the Dons he had scored twice. The season ended without Townsend having made his debut for Tottenham.

On 12 August 2010, Townsend signed another season-long loan, moving up to the Championship level with Ipswich Town, but this was terminated on 20 December, as Redknapp believed he had not been playing regularly enough. He had played 16 times, scoring once.

Tottenham debut and further loans

On 9 January 2011, Townsend made his senior Tottenham debut in a third round FA Cup tie at White Hart Lane against Charlton Athletic; he scored the first goal and was voted Man of the Match. This proved to be his only appearance for Tottenham for the rest of the season, with two further loan spells occurring. He joined Championship club Watford on 20 January 2011 on loan until the end of the season, but this was terminated early, on 23 February, with Townsend having made three appearances. On 7 March, Townsend again went on loan to a Championship club until the end of the season, this time Millwall. By April he said he would be happy to stay at the club beyond his loan spell. In 11 appearances he scored twice.

European football and further loans
For the first half of Tottenham's 2011–12 season, Townsend was a regular in their Europa League campaign, making six appearances in the competition. He scored his second goal for the club in their final match in the competition, against Shamrock Rovers on 15 December 2011, with a curled shot from outside the box. On 23 December, he signed a contract extension, making him a Tottenham player until the end of the 2016 season.

With only one other appearance for Tottenham, in the League Cup, on 1 January 2012, Townsend joined Championship club Leeds United on loan until the end of the season, but with his agent claiming he was unhappy at the club, he switched the loan to their Championship rivals Birmingham City in February. For Leeds, he made seven appearances, including what he described as "a dream debut", and scored once. For Birmingham, he made fifteen league appearances and one in the second leg of their unsuccessful promotion play-off semi-final against Blackpool.

Premier League debut
Townsend remained with Tottenham for the first half of their 2012–13 season, with the club now under a new manager, André Villas-Boas, who replaced Redknapp in the summer. He made his Premier League debut with a late substitution appearance on 16 September. Although appearing a further four times in the Premier League, these were all still late substitute appearances. Outside the league he made a further five appearances, once in the League Cup and FA Cup respectively, and three times in the Europa League. He scored his third Tottenham goal with a "superb low left-foot shot into the bottom corner from just outside the area" in a 3–0 victory against Carlisle United in the League Cup third round.

Loan to Queens Park Rangers
On 31 January 2013, Townsend followed Redknapp to Premier League club Queens Park Rangers on loan until the end of the season. He made twelve appearances for the club, including a Man of the Match performance on his debut, scoring two goals in March, a dipping volley from outside the penalty area in a 3–1 win at home to Sunderland, and an equalising deflection in a 3–2 away loss to Aston Villa. QPR were ultimately relegated, and Townsend returned to his parent club.

Established in the first team
Now back at Tottenham, Townsend started the second Premier League match of their 2013–14 season, and went on to make a total of 33 appearances, including 25 in the league. He scored twice, in a 5–0 away victory over Dinamo Tbilisi in the Europa League (his first match of the season), and his first in the Premier League in a 2–0 victory away to Aston Villa on 20 October 2013. In the middle of the season, Townsend came under the management of his third Tottenham boss, after Villas-Boas was replaced by Tim Sherwood.

Sherwood's contract was terminated at the end of the season, and Townsend started the 2014–15 season under new manager Mauricio Pochettino. He made a total of 35 appearances, scoring five goals, but was reduced to just 17 appearances in the league, having been unable to hold down a starting place until the second half of the season. He started as Tottenham lost 2–0 to Chelsea in the 2015 League Cup Final at Wembley Stadium on 1 March.

Having had nine loan spells, Townsend's career path to regular first team football for Tottenham is often discussed in the context of a wider debate in English football about the best way to develop young talent, contrasting the loan route with Premier League players being developed in Under-21 leagues, or being brought to the Premier League level via transfers from lower league clubs. According to his father, the loan spells were the making of his son's career, while Tottenham's former Director of Football Damien Comolli, who was dismissed in October 2008, believes Townsend succeeded in spite of the way Tottenham handled him.

Out of favour
On 4 November 2015, having not started a league match of the 2015–16 season, Townsend was dropped from the squad following a touchline argument with the club's fitness coach. He apologised, and Pochettino allowed him to return to the squad by 17 November, stating that the matter was over and he was available for selection again. He was an unused substitute three times following the incident, the last of which was on 10 December, but made no more first-team appearances for Tottenham.

Newcastle United

On 26 January 2016, having still not started a league match, Tottenham agreed a transfer fee with Newcastle United for Townsend, reportedly £12 million. Before the fee had been announced, Townsend had already tweeted a goodbye message, and stated "As soon as I knew of Newcastle's interest they were the only club I wanted to join...Two of the best positions you can play in football are centre-forward and left wing at Newcastle. I've got the chance. I could never turn that down. I can't wait to play my first game at St James' Park". The transfer was confirmed the following day, a five-and-a-half-year contract but with the club declining to disclose the fee. On signing, his new manager, Newcastle head coach Steve McClaren, said of Townsend that he is a "winger with an old-fashioned style. He can play on the right or the left, is two-footed, quick, very direct and loves taking on defenders and crossing the ball." According to Sky Sports, the transfer had been under negotiation for a week and Newcastle had initially wanted Townsend on loan, and then had a transfer offer of £10.5m rejected.

Despite his debut for Newcastle being in a disappointing team performance in an away defeat, at the next match, his home debut, he was given a standing ovation after a Man of the Match performance which saw Newcastle climb out of the relegation places. His first goal for the club came in his third match, a shot from just outside the area, but it was just a 90th minute consolation goal in a 5–1 away defeat to Chelsea.

Crystal Palace

On 1 July 2016, Townsend joined Premier League club Crystal Palace on a five-year contract from Newcastle following their relegation to the Championship. Palace triggered his £13 million release clause just six months after he joined from Tottenham. He was originally assigned the number 17 shirt for his first season with Palace. However, after Yannick Bolasie left for Everton, Townsend was reassigned the vacant number 10 shirt previously worn by Bolasie. On 13 August 2016, Townsend made his debut in a 1–0 defeat against West Bromwich Albion in the Premier League. He scored his first goal for the club in a 4–1 victory over Stoke City in the league on 18 September.

On 22 December 2018, Townsend scored a 30-yard volley in a 3–2 win against Manchester City in the league. His strike was later voted as Premier League Goal of the Month for December and Premier League Goal of the Season, as well as making the shortlist for the 2019 FIFA Puskás Award.

Everton
Townsend signed for Everton on 20 July 2021 on a two-year contract upon the expiry of his contract with Crystal Palace.

Townsend made his debut on 14 August 2021, assisting Richarlison's goal as Everton came from behind to beat Southampton 3–1 on the opening day of the season. On 24 August 2021, Townsend scored the winning goal in an EFL Cup round two fixture against Huddersfield Town. On 13 September 2021, Townsend scored his first Premier League goal for Everton, smashing in a long range effort from 30 yards to put Everton ahead as they went on to beat Burnley 3–1; this goal would then win him the Premier League Goal of the Month award.

International career

Youth levels
Townsend represented England at under-16, under-17 and under-19 level. He played three times for the under-16s between 2006 and 2007, making his debut in a 1–1 draw away with Wales on 20 October 2006 and his last appearance in a 2–0 away loss to Germany in April 2007. He scored twice on his under-17 debut, in a 6–1 win over Northern Ireland in August 2007, and went on to make six appearances, the last in a 0–0 draw with Portugal on 5 February 2008. Townsend's first two appearances at under-19 level came in the group stage of the 2009 European Championship; he was an unused substitute in the final, which England lost to Ukraine. He played four times in 2010, once as a starter in a friendly, and three times as a substitute in qualifiers for the 2010 competition.

Townsend received his first call up to the England under-21 team in October 2012 for the Euro 2013 play-off matches against Serbia. He made his debut in the first leg as a 65th-minute substitute for Liverpool's Raheem Sterling. He also played in two U21 friendlies, in 2012 and 2013.

In May 2013, Townsend was charged by The Football Association over alleged breaches of its rules on betting. He subsequently voluntarily withdrew from England's squad for the upcoming European Under-21 Championship finals. He later admitted to charges under the FA's rules for breaching football betting regulations. After a personal hearing, he was fined £18,000 and suspended for four months backdated to 23 May, with three months suspended until 1 July 2016.

Senior team
Townsend's first call-up to the senior England squad came in September 2013, for the World Cup qualifiers against Moldova and Ukraine. He made his senior debut against Montenegro in a World Cup qualifier on 11 October, during which he scored the third goal of a 4–1 win with a "low swerving finish" from outside the penalty area after 78 minutes, two minutes before being substituted, and was named man of the match. He earned a second cap four days later against Poland, playing almost all of the 2–0 home win. A second England goal came in the Euro 2016 qualification campaign in a 5–0 win over San Marino on 9 October 2014, as he came on for the final third of the match. His next appearance marked his third England goal; on 31 March 2015 he scored the equaliser in the 79th minute against Italy, having come on seven minutes earlier in a friendly match which ended 1–1. The 20-yard strike was described as a "sweet right-foot drive into the bottom corner"; Townsend took to Twitter immediately after the match to respond to Paul Merson after he had said Townsend's club form did not justify him being in the England team.

Personal life
Townsend was born in Leytonstone, Greater London. He is the son of Troy Townsend, Head of Development for Kick It Out. He is of paternal Jamaican and maternal Greek Cypriot descent. He was brought up in Chingford, and is a lifelong Tottenham fan. He attended Rush Croft Sports College. When Townsend was 10, his half-brother Kurtis died in a car accident, aged 18.

Townsend was filmed singing the song "Stand By Me" by Ben E. King with the rest of the Tottenham youth players in the dressing room, which became a popular internet video.

Townsend said in a December 2019 interview that he had been a problem gambler, compulsively betting online on football. He lost £46,000 on a single bet in 2012 on the night before a play-off game for Birmingham. After being caught for breaking the FA's anti-betting rules, he went to counselling.

Career statistics

Club

International

As of match played 15 November 2016. England score listed first, score column indicates score after each Townsend goal.

Honours
Tottenham Hotspur
Football League Cup runner-up: 2014–15

England U19
UEFA European Under-19 Championship runner-up: 2009

Individual
Premier League Goal of the Month: March 2017, December 2018, September 2021
Premier League Goal of the Season: 2018–19
London Football Awards Goal of the Season: 2019

References

External links

Profile at the Everton F.C. website

1991 births
Living people
Footballers from Leytonstone
Footballers from Chingford
English footballers
England youth international footballers
England under-21 international footballers
England international footballers
Association football wingers
Tottenham Hotspur F.C. players
Ipswich Town F.C. players
Yeovil Town F.C. players
Leyton Orient F.C. players
Milton Keynes Dons F.C. players
Watford F.C. players
Millwall F.C. players
Leeds United F.C. players
Birmingham City F.C. players
Queens Park Rangers F.C. players
Newcastle United F.C. players
Crystal Palace F.C. players
Everton F.C. players
English Football League players
Premier League players
English people of Greek Cypriot descent
English people of Jamaican descent